Castle Hill is an archaeological site located on the island of Barbuda in the Barbuda Highlands. Castle Hill also has a beach.

Castle Hill is the highest point on Barbuda, at an elevation of 122 meters (400 feet) above sea level.

References 

Barbuda Highlands